José Higinio Uriarte y García del Barrio (11 January 1843 in Asunción – 21 April 1909) was a Paraguayan politician and President from April 12, 1877 to November 25, 1878.

He was Juan Bautista Gill's cousin. He served as President of the Chamber of Deputies, and was elected as Vice President 1874. After Gill was assassinated, Uriarte became the acting President for the remainder of Gill's four-year-term. He was Minister of Finance of Paraguay from 1887 to 1889.

References

1843 births
1909 deaths
People from Asunción
Paraguayan people of Basque descent
Presidents of Paraguay
Vice presidents of Paraguay
Presidents of the Senate of Paraguay
Presidents of the Chamber of Deputies of Paraguay
Finance Ministers of Paraguay